Ignatiy Sidor (born 21 August 1998) is a Belarusian professional footballer who plays for Naftan Novopolotsk.

Career
On 18 July 2022, Khujand announced that Sidor had left the club by mutual agreement having played three times for the club.

References

External links 
 
 
 Profile at Torpedo-BelAZ Zhodino website 

1998 births
Living people
People from Zhodzina
Sportspeople from Minsk Region
Belarusian footballers
Association football defenders
Belarusian expatriate footballers
Expatriate footballers in Tajikistan
FC Torpedo-BelAZ Zhodino players
FC Granit Mikashevichi players
FC Lida players
FC Smorgon players
FC Krumkachy Minsk players
FK Khujand players
FC Naftan Novopolotsk players